Jean-Louis Coustillet (7 January 1943 – 14 March 2021) was a French football player and coach who played as a midfielder.

Biography
Born in Bayel, Coustillet grew up playing for the local football team. He began playing for RC Lens at the age of 25, where he played for two seasons before joining AAJ Blois. He retired from playing in 1978 as a member of ES Viry-Châtillon.

After he retired from his playing career, Coustillet continued his involvement with ES Viry-Châtillon as a coach, where he stayed for nine years. He coached the only Châtillon team to ever play in Division 2 from 1982 to 1983. He then joined FC Saint-Lô Manche, where he coached from 1984 to 1988. However, Coustillet coached them into  and helped the club reach the round of 16 in 1991–92 Coupe de France, where they were defeated by US Saint-Omer. He left the club in 1992.

Coustillet died of Alzheimer's disease in Bayel on 14 March 2021 at the age of 78.

References

1943 births
2021 deaths
Sportspeople from Aube
French footballers
Association football midfielders
RC Lens players
Blois Football 41 players
ES Viry-Châtillon players
French football managers
ES Troyes AC managers
Deaths from Alzheimer's disease
Footballers from Grand Est